Randy Dorman is a former American Paralympic athlete. He represented the United States at the 1988 Summer Paralympics held in Seoul, South Korea and he won the gold medal in the men's 100 meters 1C event. He also set a new world record of 20.14 seconds.

References

External links 
 

Living people
Year of birth missing (living people)
Place of birth missing (living people)
Paralympic track and field athletes of the United States
Athletes (track and field) at the 1988 Summer Paralympics
Paralympic gold medalists for the United States
Medalists at the 1988 Summer Paralympics
Paralympic medalists in athletics (track and field)
American male wheelchair racers
20th-century American people